Orchestia is a genus of amphipods in the family Talitridae, containing the following species:

Orchestia aestuarensis Wildish, 1987
Orchestia aucklandiae Bate, 1862
Orchestia bottae Milne-Edwards, 1840
Orchestia canariensis Dahl, 1950
Orchestia cavimana Heller, 1865
Orchestia chevreuxi de Guerne, 1887
Orchestia dassenensis (K. H. Barnard, 1916)
Orchestia gambierensis Chevreux, 1908
Orchestia gammarellus (Pallas, 1766)
Orchestia ghigii Vecchi, 1929
Orchestia gomeri Stock, 1989
Orchestia grillus (Bosc, 1802)
Orchestia guancha Stock & Boxshall, 1989
Orchestia guernei Chevreux, 1889
Orchestia kokuboi Uéno, 1929
Orchestia kosswigi Ruffo, 1949
Orchestia magnifica Vecchi, 1931
Orchestia marquesana Stephensen, 1935
Orchestia mateusi Afonso, 1977
Orchestia mediterranea Costa, 1853
Orchestia microphtalma Amanieu & Salvat, 1963
Orchestia montagui Audouin, 1826
Orchestia monticola Stock & Abreu, 1992
Orchestia ponapensis J. L. Barnard, 1960
Orchestia pyatakovi Derzhavin, 1937
Orchestia scutigerula Dana, 1853
Orchestia selkirki Stebbing, 1888
Orchestia solifuga Iwasa, 1939
Orchestia stephenseni Cecchini, 1928
Orchestia stocki Ruffo, 1990
Orchestia sulensoni Stebbing, 1899

References

Gammaridea